Game of Thrones: Season 1 is the soundtrack album for the first season of HBO series Game of Thrones. Composed by Ramin Djawadi, it was released on June 14, 2011 for digital download and on CD. Djawadi accepted the task 10 weeks before the show premiered, after Stephen Warbeck left the project.

The soundtrack has received neutral to favorable reviews and peaked at number 17 on the US Billboard Soundtrack Albums chart. It was nominated for International Film Music Critics Association for Best Original Score for a Television Series.

Production and release
The soundtrack to Game of Thrones was originally to be composed by Stephen Warbeck. On February 2, 2011, only ten weeks prior to the show's premiere, it was reported that Warbeck had left the project and Ramin Djawadi had been commissioned to write the music instead. The music supervisor of Game of Thrones, Evyen Klean, first suggested Djawadi to showrunners David Benioff and D. B. Weiss as the replacement for Warbeck, and although Djawadi was reluctant as he had other commitments at that time, they managed to persuade him to accept the project.

The producers asked Djawadi to give the series its own distinctive musical identity by avoiding certain musical elements such as flutes or solo vocals previously used successfully by other major fantasy productions. He mentioned that a challenge in scoring the series was its reliance on dialogue and its sprawling cast: on several occasions already-scored music had to be omitted so as not to get in the way of dialogue. Djawadi also evolved the themes with the characters, noting in a 2017 interview that Daenerys's theme "[initially] plays on a couple of instruments on top of the Dothraki music. It's almost like it doesn't have its own identity yet. It sets itself apart during the finale of season 1 when the dragon eggs hatch."

Djawadi said that he was inspired to write the main title music by an early version of the series' computer-animated title sequence.  The theme would be repeated all through the series, particularly at important scenes. Many of the recordings were done by solo musicians, while the larger pieces are recorded with a full orchestra and a choir in Prague.  The recordings were done with Djawadi communicating with the musicians in Prague over the Internet.

The album was made available for download on iTunes on June 14, 2011, together with a "digital booklet". It was released on CD on June 28, 2011, 41 days after the show's premiere.  It was later released as a 2 LP double album, and in 2016 re-released in picture disc format by Newbury Comics.

Reception
Richard Buxton of Tracksounds wrote an ambivalent review, calling the album a "valiant effort" and Djawadi's "most consistently satisfying work to date". The soundtrack also received a score of 4/5 from Heather Phares of AllMusic. Jørn Tillnes, writing for Soundtrack Geek, highlighted the opening theme as "one of the better main themes for any television series out there. It is epic and massive, and that theme is just something you give yourself up to. It's that good and can't be missed." Jonathan Weilbaecher praises the soundtrack as doing "a supreme job mixing emotion with epic, a trick that even the very best have a hard time with."

Track listing

Credits and personnel
Personnel adapted from the album liner notes.

 David Benioff – liner notes
 Brandon Campbell – technical score advisor
 Ramin Djawadi – composer, primary artist, producer
 Patricia Sullivan Fourstar – mastering
 Evyen J. Klean – music supervisor

 Dave Klotz – music editor
 Robin Quinn – music editor
 Bobby Tahouri – additional music
 Robert Townson – executive producer
 D.B. Weiss – liner notes

Charts

Awards and nominations

References

Ramin Djawadi soundtracks
2011 soundtrack albums
Soundtrack
Classical music soundtracks
Instrumental soundtracks
Television soundtracks
Varèse Sarabande soundtracks